Flinders is a single-member electoral district for the South Australian House of Assembly. It is named after explorer Matthew Flinders, who was responsible for charting most of the state's coastline. It is a 58,901 km² coastal rural electorate encompassing the Eyre Peninsula and the coast along the Nullarbor Plain, based in and around the city of Port Lincoln and contains the District Councils of Ceduna, Cleve, Elliston, Lower Eyre Peninsula, Streaky Bay and Wudinna; as well as the localities of Fowlers Bay, Nullarbor and Yalata in the Pastoral Unincorporated Area. The seat was expanded in 2002 to include a western strip of land all the way to the Western Australia border.

Flinders is the only one of the original 17 electorates to be contested at every election. Created as a single-member electorate in 1857, it was a dual-member electorate 1862–1875, 1884–1902 and 1915–1938, and a three-member electorate 1875–1884 and 1902–1915.

A single-member electorate since 1938, it was held by Edward Craigie of the Single Tax League from 1938 to 1941. It has been in the hands of a conservative party–the Liberals (and their predecessors, the Liberal and Country League) or the Nationals–ever since. For most of that time, it has been safely conservative even by the standards of rural South Australia, although Labor came close to winning it with a 46.5 percent two-party vote at the 1962 election. Members have typically held the seat for 10 to 20 years.

The LCL/Liberal hold on the seat was broken in 1973 when Peter Blacker claimed the seat for the Nationals, then known as the Country Party. He held it until 1993, when Kangaroo Island was briefly redistributed to Flinders, allowing Liberal Liz Penfold to take the seat on a large swing of over 14 percent. Penfold actually won enough votes on the first count to win the seat outright. Blacker sought a rematch in 1997, after Kangaroo Island was removed. However, without the advantages of incumbency, Blacker not only lost, but suffered a further swing of three percent. The seat has reverted to form, and has been a comfortably safe Liberal seat ever since.

Flinders was also the name of an electoral district of the unicameral South Australian Legislative Council from 1851 until its abolition in 1857.

Members for Flinders

Election results

Notes

References
 ECSA profile for Flinders: 2018
 ABC profile for Flinders: 2018
 Poll Bludger profile for Flinders: 2018

External links

Electoral districts of South Australia
Eyre Peninsula
1857 establishments in Australia